Pwllheli Rugby Football Club (Welsh: Clwb Rygbi Pwllheli) is a rugby union team from the town of Pwllheli, in Gwynedd, North Wales. Pwllheli RFC is a member of the Welsh Rugby Union  and is a feeder club for RGC 1404. They currently compete in the WRU Division One North league.

Notable past players
 George North
 Rhodri Jones
 Jack Roberts

Club honours
 WRU Division Five North 2007/08 Champions
 WRU Division One North 2014/15 Champions

References

Welsh rugby union teams
Rugby clubs established in 1972
1972 establishments in Wales
Pwllheli
Sport in Gwynedd